The 1958 United States Senate elections were elections for the United States Senate which occurred in the middle of President Dwight D. Eisenhower's second term. Thirty-two seats of Class 1 were contested in regular elections, the new state of Alaska held its first Senate elections for its Class 2 and 3 seats, and two special elections were held to fill vacancies.

As is common in mid-term elections, the party in the White House lost seats, but losses this year were heavy due to the Recession of 1958, the Eisenhower Administration's position on right-to-work issues that galvanized labor unions which supported Democrats, and the launch of Sputnik. This was the first time since 1934 that Democrats gained seats in this class of Senators. Democrats won both seats in West Virginia, making the last time that Democrats simultaneously flipped both of a state's Senate seats until Georgia's elections in 2020 and 2021.

The Democratic Party gained a record 15 seats in this election, defeating 10 Republican incumbents, gaining three open Republican seats, and winning both seats from the new state of Alaska. This gave the Democrats a strong Senate majority of 64–34 over the Republicans, and the largest swing in the history of the Senate. After the new state of Hawaii elected its first Senators in 1959, the Senate's balance changed to 65–35.

This is only one of two occasions in U.S. history that 10 or more Senate seats changed hands in a mid-term election (the other being in 1946), and also one of five occasions where 10 or more Senate seats changed hands in an election, with the other occasions being in 1920, 1932, 1946, and 1980.

Results summary 

For the November 5 and 25, 1958 regular and special elections.

Colored shading indicates party with largest share of that row.

Source: Clerk of the U.S. House of Representatives

Gains, losses, and holds

Retirements
Six Republicans retired instead of seeking re-election.

Defeats
Ten Republicans sought re-election but lost in the general election.

New states
Alaska was admitted into the Union and elected two Democrats to the Senate.

Post-election changes
Hawaii was admitted into the Union and elected one Democrat and one Republican to the Senate on July 28th, 1959.

Change in composition

Before the elections

After the elections

Race summaries

Special / new state elections 
In the special elections, the winners were seated during 1958 or before January 3, 1959. In the new state elections, the winners were seated with the new Congress on January 3, 1959. Ordered by election date.

Elections leading to the next Congress 
In these regular elections, the winners were elected for the term beginning January 3, 1959; ordered by state.

All of the elections involved the Class 1 seats.

Closest races 
Eleven races had a margin of victory under 10%:

Maine was the tipping point state with a margin of 21.6%.

Alaska 

Alaska would become a new state January 3, 1959 and it elected two initial senators November 25, 1958, in advance of statehood. The Democratic Party thereby picked up 2 more seats.

In their next elections, Alaska's senators would be elected to 6-year terms.

The class 2 race, for the 2-year term ending in 1961, was between the Democratic incumbent territorial delegate Bob Bartlett, and the Republican Juneau attorney R. E. Robertson.

Bartlett would be re-elected twice and serve until his death in 1968.

The class 3 race, for the 4-year term ending in 1963, pitted two former territorial governors, Democrat Ernest Gruening against Republican Mike Stepovich. Gruening won a close race.

Gruening would be re-elected in 1962 and serve until losing renomination in 1968.

Arizona

California

Connecticut 

In Connecticut, Democrat Thomas J. Dodd defeated incumbent senator William A. Purtell who ran for a second term.

Delaware 

Two-term Republican John J. Williams was re-elected to a third term.

Williams would be re-elected in 1964, serving four terms until his 1970 retirement.

Florida 

Incumbent Democrat Senator Holland, a conservative, was challenged by former senator Claude Pepper, who had been unseated in 1950. Holland had played a role in recruiting George A. Smathers to run against the liberal Pepper in that election. The two served as colleagues in the Senate from 1947 to 1951.

Indiana 

Incumbent Republican William E. Jenner did not seek a second full term in office and was replaced by Democrat Vance Hartke, the mayor of Evansville. Hartke defeated incumbent Republican Governor of Indiana Harold W. Handley.

Jenner resigned shortly before the election and urged Handley, Jenner's political protégé, to seek his seat. A plan was proposed whereby Handley would resign the governorship, his lieutenant would appoint him senator, and he would finish the term and run as an incumbent. When the plan was revealed to the party leadership, they strongly advised him to not implement it because they feared it would hurt the party and be perceived as a scandal.

Handley did not resign from the governorship during his campaign and was widely criticized for the unprecedented action. Hartke accused Handley of raising taxes, breaking of his campaign promise, his reluctance in supporting right-to-work, and rising state unemployment. Statewide unemployment was just above 10% in April, but dropped to 6.9% by the end of September.

Maine 

Maine held its election September 8, 1958, in keeping with its routine practice of holding elections before the November national Election Day. Democrat Edmund Muskie defeated one-term Republican incumbent, Frederick G. Payne by a wide margin, 61–39%.

Maryland

Massachusetts

Michigan

Minnesota 

In Minnesota, Democratic Representative Eugene McCarthy defeated incumbent senator Edward John Thye who ran for a third term.

Mississippi 

Two-term Democrat John C. Stennis was re-elected with no opposition.

Stennis would be re-elected four more times, serving until his retirement in 1989.

Missouri 

Incumbent Democrat Stuart Symington was re-elected to a second term. Hazel Palmer was the first woman ever nominated for United States senator in Missouri.

Montana 

Incumbent Mike Mansfield, who was first elected to the Senate in 1952, ran for re-election. Mansfield won the Democratic primary comfortably, and moved on to the general election, where he was opposed by Lou W. Welch, a millworker and the Republican nominee. In contrast to the close campaign in 1952, Mansfield defeated Welch in a landslide and won his second term in the Senate easily.

Nebraska 

Republican Roman Hruska had won a 1954 special election and ran for a full term.  He beat Democratic attorney Frank B. Morrison, who had previously lost his challenger bid for Nebraska's 1st congressional district.

Hruska would be re-elected two more times and serve until his 1976 retirement.

Morrison would be elected Governor of Nebraska in 1960 and serve there for six years from 1961 to 1967, and was re-elected twice while running unsuccessfully for U.S. senator.

Nevada 

In Nevada, incumbent Republican George W. Malone ran for re-election to a third term, but was defeated by Democrat Howard Cannon.

The campaign was considered one of the most competitive and highly watched in the nation in 1958. Senator Malone was known nationally as a leader within the Republican Party's right wing and held key appointments on the Senate Finance and Interior Committees.

Malone campaigned on his experience and seniority in the Senate, using the slogan "He Knows Nevada Best." He received support from Eisenhower cabinet secretaries Fred Seaton and Ezra Taft Benson. Benson, one of the Twelve Apostles of the Church of Jesus Christ of Latter-Day Saints, was especially influential among Nevada's large Mormon population. His endorsement was seen as particularly important in light of Cannon's Mormon faith. Late in the campaign, Malone published full-page ads touting his effort to save Nevada from a federal gambling tax.

Cannon focused his attacks on Malone's absentee record in the Senate and his reputation on Capitol Hill as an unpopular extremist.

Cannon won the election by a safe margin owing to his overwhelming support in his native Clark County, which contained 47 percent of the state's registered voters. He was the first candidate from southern Nevada elected to the United States Senate.

Senator Malone was unopposed for re-nomination by the Republican Party.

New Jersey 

Incumbent Republican H. Alexander Smith chose not to seek a third term in office. Democratic U.S. Representative Harrison Williams won the open seat over U.S. Representative Robert Kean.

New Mexico

New York 

Incumbent Republican Irving Ives retired. Republican Representative Kenneth Keating defeated Democrat Frank Hogan to succeed Ives.

North Carolina (special) 

Democrat W. Kerr Scott had died April 16, 1958 and former Democratic Governor of North Carolina B. Everett Jordan was appointed April 19, 1958 to continue the term, pending a special election.  Jordan was then re-elected in November.

Jordan would later be twice re-elected and serve until 1973.

North Dakota 

Incumbent Republican, and former Non-Partisan League (NPL) senator, William Langer, was re-elected to a fourth term, defeating North Dakota Democratic NPL Party (Dem-NPL) candidate Raymond G. Vendsel.

Only Langer filed as a Republican, and the endorsed Democratic-NPL candidate was Raymond G. Vendsel. Langer and Vendsel won the primary elections for their respective parties.

Two independent candidates, Arthur C. Townley and Custer Solem, also filed before the deadline but had minimal impact on the outcome of the election, totaling less than 3,000 votes combined. Townley was known as the creator of the National Non-Partisan League, and had previously sought North Dakota's other senate seat in 1956.

Langer would die in office less than a year into what became his final term. A special election was held in 1960 triggered by Langer's death.

Ohio 

Incumbent Republican John W. Bricker was defeated in his bid for a third term by U.S. Representative Stephen M. Young.

Pennsylvania 

Incumbent Republican Edward Martin did not seek re-election. The Republican nominee, Hugh Scott, defeated the term-limited Democratic Governor of Pennsylvania George M. Leader for the vacant seat.

Scott would be twice re-elected, rising to the Senate Minority leader, and serve until retiring in 1977.  Leader retired from public service after the defeat.

Rhode Island 

Two-term incumbent Democrat John Pastore was easily re-elected over Republican attorney Bayard Ewing, a repeat of their 1952 race.

Ewing would later serve as the national chairman of the United Way (1969–1972) and the Rhode Island School of Design (1967–1985).

Tennessee

Texas

Utah

Vermont 

Incumbent Republican Ralph Flanders did not run for re-election to another term in the United States Senate. Republican candidate Winston L. Prouty defeated Democratic candidate Frederick J. Fayette to succeed him.

Virginia 

Incumbent Harry F. Byrd Sr. was re-elected after defeating Independent Louise Wensel and Social Democrat Clarke Robb.

Washington

West Virginia

West Virginia (regular) 

In 1956, senator Harley M. Kilgore died, and former senator William Revercomb won his seat in the 1956 special election. Revercomb sought re-election to a third term, but was defeated by Congressman Robert Byrd. This election was the beginning of Byrd's lifelong career in the Senate.

West Virginia (special) 

Incumbent Democrat Matthew M. Neely died of cancer January 8, 1958 and Republican John D. Hoblitzell Jr. was appointed January 25, 1958 to continue the term, pending a special election.

Former Democratic congressman Jennings Randolph was elected to finish the term that would run through 1961. Byrd however, would become the senior Senator from West Virginia as he was elected to his first full six year term.

Randolph would be re-elected four times and serve until his retirement in 1985.  Hoblitzell resumed his business interests and died January 6, 1962.

Wisconsin

Wyoming

See also 
 1958 United States elections
 1958 United States gubernatorial elections
 1958 United States House of Representatives elections
 85th United States Congress
 86th United States Congress

Notes

References